Charles Leland Sonnichsen (September 20, 1901 – June 29, 1991) was a Benedict Professor of English at the University of Texas, El Paso.  In addition to being a noted Southwestern historian and folklorist, he was a prolific author and screenwriter. Among his many books are The Mescalero Apaches, Alias Billy the Kid and Tucson: The Life and Times of an American City. Sonichsen was the 23rd president of the Western Historical Association.

Early life and education 
Born in Fonda, Iowa, Sonnichsen's family later moved to Minnesota where he attended public school in Wadena, Minnesota.  He received his B.A. from the University of Minnesota in 1924 and then went on to graduate study at Harvard University, where he received his Ph.D. in 1931.

Career 
Sonnichsen first held teaching positions St. James School in Faribault, Minnesota, and Carnegie Institute of Technology before relocating to El Paso, Texas and taking a role as associate professor of English at the Texas College of Mines and Metallurgy (later The University of Texas at El Paso). He rose through teaching and administrative ranks to professor, chairman of the English Department (a post he held for twenty-seven years), dean of the graduate school, and H. Y. Benedict Professor of English. He retired from the University in 1972 after a forty-one-year career there and moved to Tucson, Arizona, where he was editor of the Journal of Arizona History from 1972 to 1977 and continued to write and edit books.

Books 
Sonnichsen authored thirty-four books, including Billy King's Tombstone (1942), Roy Bean: Law West of the Pecos (1943), Cowboys and Cattle Kings (1950), I'll Die 
Before I'll Run (1951), Alias Billy the Kid (1955), Ten Texas Feuds (1957), The Mescalero Apaches (1958), Tularosa: Last of the Frontier West (1960), Outlaw: Bill Mitchell, Alias Baldy Russell (1964), Pass of the North: Four Centuries on the Rio Grande (two volumes, 1968, 1980),  Colonel Greene and the Copper Skyrocket (1974) and From Hopalong to Hud: Thoughts on Western Fiction (1978).  In the last years of his life, he continued to publish and edited several more books: Geronimo and the End of the Apache Wars (1987), Pilgrim in the Sun: A Southwestern Omnibus (1988), and The Laughing West (1988).

Awards 
Sonnichsen received the Spur Award for Best Short Subject, the Spur Award for Best Nonfiction, and the Spur Award for Best Short Fiction.

References

20th-century American historians
American male non-fiction writers
1901 births
1991 deaths
University of Minnesota alumni
Carnegie Mellon University faculty
University of Texas at El Paso faculty
Harvard University alumni
20th-century American male writers